Apostolepis kikoi is a species of snake in the family Colubridae. It is endemic to Brazil.

References 

kikoi
Reptiles described in 2018
Reptiles of Brazil